The Bonda mastiff bat or Thomas's mastiff bat (Molossus currentium), is a species of mastiff bat from South and Central America. It is named for the town of Bonda, near Santa Marta in Colombia.

Description
The fur ranges from dull black to reddish orange, with paler underparts, while the wings, muzzle, and ears are black.

Distribution and habitat
The Bonda mastiff bat inhabits two discrete regions. In the north, it is found in eastern Central America from Honduras to Panama, and from northern Venezuela and Colombia, through Ecuador, to extreme northern Peru. In the south, it is found in the Mato Grosso region of Brazil, through Paraguay, into north-eastern Argentina. Within these regions, it primarily inhabits tropical rainforest below about  elevation.

Biology and behaviour
Bonda mastiff bats are nocturnal and insectivorous, with moths forming a significant part of their diet. They commonly roost during the day in caves and hollow tree trunks, but have often been found roosting in buildings. Female bats give birth to a single young, with pregnant individuals being noted in both March and August. At least some females may enter oestrus more than once in a given year.

References

Molossus (bat)
Mammals of Colombia
Bats of Central America
Taxa named by Oldfield Thomas
Mammals described in 1900
Bats of South America